Susuz is a town and a district of Kars Province in the Eastern Anatolia region of Turkey. The population is 2,448 as of 2010.The mayor is Oğuz Yantemur from the Republican People's Party (CHP).

Notable Locals
 Tuncer Bakırhan, Politician

References

Towns in Turkey
Populated places in Kars Province
Districts of Kars Province
Kurdish settlements in Turkey